Chafika Bensaoula is an Algerian jurist who was elected to the African Court on Human and Peoples' Rights for a six-year term in 2017.

Early life and education
Bensaoula was born in Algeria and has a doctorate in public law.

Career
Bensaoula has been a judge of the Criminal Affair Chambers and Court of Appeal in Algeria. She is a lecturer at the National School of Magistracy in Algeria. She was Director of the Department of Legal Studies and Documentation at the Ministry of Justice. In April 2016, she was nominated for the International Narcotics Control Board. She is on the governing board of administrators for the International Institute for Justice and the Rule of Law.

Bensaoula was elected to the African Court at the African Union meeting in Addis Ababa in January 2017, alongside Malawian Tujilane Chizumila. The two were sworn in on 6 March, bringing the number of women on the court to five of eleven judges for the first time and fulfilling the gender parity requirement of the Protocol establishing the court.

Personal life
Bensaoula speaks Arabic, English and French.

References

Living people
Women judges
Algerian judges
Judges of the African Court on Human and Peoples' Rights
Algerian judges of international courts and tribunals
Year of birth missing (living people)
21st-century Algerian people